The 58th edition of the Vuelta a Colombia was held from May 10 to May 25, 2008. Colombia's Giovanny Báez was crowned champion after 50 hours, 25 minutes and 55 seconds or riding through the plains and mountains of Colombia. The last stage, an urban race through the streets of Cali, was won by Artur García. The 27-year-old Báez was the 33rd cyclist to win the Tour of Colombia.

Stages

2008-05-10: Barrancabermeja — Barrancabermeja (8.4 km)

2008-05-11: Barrancabermeja — Bucaramanga (146.9 km)

2008-05-12: Piedecuesta — El Socorro (136.4 km)

2008-05-13: El Socorro — Tunja (169.5 km)

2008-05-14: Tunja — La Vega (192 km)

2008-05-15: San Francisco — La Dorada (135 km)

2008-05-16: Doradal — El Santuario (115.3 km)

2008-05-17: Río Negro — La Unión (163.6 km)

2008-05-18: Medellín — Santa Elena (31 km)

2008-05-20: Caldas — Manizales (173 km)

2008-05-21: Manizales — Mariquita (176.8 km)

2008-05-22: Mariquita — La Linéa (176.8 km)

2008-05-23: Quimbaya — Pereira (158.2 km)

2008-05-24: Cartago — Cali (190.4 km)

2008-05-25: Cali — Cali (96 km)

Final classification

See also 
 2008 Clásico RCN

References 
 dewielersite
 cyclingnews

Vuelta a Colombia
Colombia
Vuelta a